Terry R. Hardy (born May 31, 1976) is a former professional American football player who played tight end for the Arizona Cardinals for four seasons.

References 

1976 births
Living people
American football tight ends
Players of American football from Montgomery, Alabama
Southern Miss Golden Eagles football players
Arizona Cardinals players